William Hale (21 October 1797 – 30 March 1870), was a British inventor and rocket pioneer.

Biography 

Hale was born in Colchester, England in 1797. He was self-taught although his grandfather, the educator William Cole, is believed to have tutored him. By 1827 he had obtained his first patent; he also won a first class Gold Medal of the Royal Society of Arts in Paris for his paper on ship propulsion using an early form of jet propulsion.

Hale was inducted into the International Space Hall of Fame in 2004.

Rocketry 

In 1844, Hale patented a new form of rotary rocket that improved on the earlier Congreve rocket design. Hale removed the guidestick from the design, instead vectoring part of the thrust through canted exhaust holes to provide rotation of the rocket, which improved its stability in flight.

Hale rockets were first used by the United States Army in the Mexican–American War of 1846–1848. Although the British Army experimented with Hale rockets during the Crimean War of 1853–1856 they did not officially adopt them until 1867. It was only generally used by the U.S. Navy.

References

Bibliography 

Frank H. Winter, The first golden age of rocketry: Congreve and Hale rockets of the nineteenth century, (Washington and London: Smithsonian Institution Press, 1990), p. 321 illus.

External links

19th-century British inventors
1870 deaths
1797 births
Early rocketry